Richard Howell was the Governor of New Jersey.

Richard Howell may also refer to:

Richard P. Howell (1831–1899), American carpenter, businessman, and politician
Richard Howell (comics) (born 1955), American comic book creator
Richard Howell (swimmer) (1903–1967), American freestyle swimmer
Richard Howell (cricketer) (born 1982), English cricketer
Richard Howell (basketball) (born 1990), American basketball player
Richard Howell (MP), Member of Parliament for Haverfordwest